Father Needs a Wife is a 1952 West German comedy film directed by Harald Braun and starring Dieter Borsche, Ruth Leuwerik and Bruni Löbel. It was made at the Bavaria Studios in Munich and on location around Lautersee and Mittenwald. The film's sets were designed by the art directors  Hans Sohnle and Fritz Lück.

Plot
A widowed father advertises for a new maid, but his children secretly seek a woman to be his new wife.

Cast
Dieter Borsche as Dr. Hans Neumeister
Ruth Leuwerik as Susanne Meissner
Bruni Löbel as Lotti Hellwig
Günther Lüders as Photograph Kurt Fischer
Therese Giehse as Frau Nickel
Paul Bildt as Herr in der Anzeigenannahme
Wera Frydtberg as Gisela
Angelika Meissner as Ulla Neumeister - daughter
Urs Hess as Philipp Neumeister - Age 11
Migg Hess as Martin Neumeister - Age 10
Oliver Grimm as Tom Neumeister - Age 4

References

External links

1952 comedy films
German comedy films
West German films
Films directed by Harald Braun
German black-and-white films
1950s German films